Kretschmann is a German occupational surname literally meaning "innkeeper" associated with the term  for village inn. Notable people with the surname include:

 Erich Kretschmann, German physicist
 Steffen Kretschmann, German boxer 
 Thomas Kretschmann, German actor 
 Winfried Kretschmann (born 1948), German politician

See also
 Cabinet Kretschmann (disambiguation), two governments of the German state of Baden-Württemberg since 2011
 Kretschmann scalar, a quadratic scalar invariant in the theory of Lorentzian manifolds

German-language surnames
Occupational surnames